Ulysses "Slow Kid" Thompson (August 28, 1888 – March 17, 1990) was a comedian, singer, tap and acrobatic dancer whose nickname was inspired by his ability to perform a comical, and incredibly slow, dance routine. His career included work in circus, medicine, minstrel, vaudeville, and Broadway.

Early years
Ulysses was born in Prescott, Arkansas, to George Washington Thompson, and Hanna Pandora Driver. His mother died of typhus when Ulysses was seven years old, and he ran away from home at age fourteen. Initially, he worked in positions of traditional labor, but he obtained the early skills of an entertainer while dancing in the street for nickels and dimes. His experiences led to a job performing a Juba Dance in a traveling medicine show. Ulysses would dance and tell jokes, providing entertainment to the crowds who came to see the "Doctor". Medicine shows were common during that period of American history and they provided many young men with an opportunity to develop more professional skills.

By the winter of 1904, he was working in Louisiana for The Mighty Hagg Circus. Over the next few years, he worked for Patterson's World Carnival, Heger and Hopper Stock Shows, the Sells Floto Circus, the Gentry Brothers Dog and Pony Show, the Hagenbeck-Wallace Circus, and the Ringling Brothers Circus.

At the end of Ringling Brothers 1915 season, he joined Ralph Dunbar's Tennessee Ten on the Keith-Proctor circuit. His tap dancing and acrobatic skills were said to be exceptional, and he was considered to be a master of slow-motion dance. It was as dance director for the Tennessee Ten that he met the young singer and dancer Florence Mills (1895–1927).

Military service 
In 1918, Thompson was drafted by the U.S. Army. He served with the 5th Army, 92nd Infantry Division, 366th Regiment in France during the war and his military classification was Musician 3rd Class. In that position, he entertained the troops by performing as Drum Major in the Army's Band.

Career highlights 
Upon his return to the United States in 1919, Ulysses visited relatives in Hot Springs, Arkansas, before rejoining the Tennessee Ten for five more seasons, working forty weeks a year.

In 1921, Ulysses married Florence Mills in New York, and in 1922, the couple joined the cast of Noble Sissle and Eubie Blake's Shuffle Along. They also worked together at the Plantation Club as members of Lew Leslie's Plantation Revue, which starred Mills. Traveling to London, they performed together in C.B. Cochran's Dover Street to Dixie and in Paris they performed in Dixie to Paris, before returning to New York to join Dixie to Broadway (1924–1925).

In 1926, they returned to Paris for Lew Leslie's Blackbirds of 1926 with Ulysses as a featured dancer and Mills being the star attraction. Upon recognizing her talent was greater than his own, Thompson subjugated his career to be her manager and promoter.

When his wife became sick in 1927 and died of a tuberculosis-related disease, Thompson was distraught, but he worked hard to revive his former career as a dancer.

The 1930s saw him performing worldwide as a tap dancer in such distant places as Auckland and Wellington, New Zealand; Bucharest, Romania; Budapest, Hungary; Berlin, Germany; Bombay, India; Manila, Philippines; Shanghai and Hong Kong, China; Hawaii; Cuba; and Australia, where he made three tours under the management of George Sorlie.

On August 21, 1946, in Las Vegas, Thompson married again, to Dr. Gertrude Curtis, noted in her own right as New York's first black woman dentist. She herself was the widow of lyricist Cecil Mack who contributed the words for many Williams and Walker Show tunes. Thompson continued to be active in the entertainment industry until approximately 1969.

Death 
Thompson lived to the age of 101. In his later years, he lived at a nursing home in Little Rock. He died on March 17, 1990, at the home of a relative in Little Rock. Thompson was a veteran of the U.S. Army, where he served as Musician, 3rd Class, during WWI. His burial was in Little Rock National Cemetery.

References

1888 births
1990 deaths
People from Prescott, Arkansas
Musicians from Little Rock, Arkansas
African-American male comedians
American male comedians
20th-century American comedians
African-American male dancers
African-American dancers
American male dancers
African-American male singers
American circus performers
Vaudeville performers
Buffalo Soldiers
American centenarians
African-American centenarians
20th-century American singers
20th-century American dancers
20th-century American male singers
Men centenarians